The boys' giant slalom competition of the 2020 Winter Youth Olympics was held at the Les Diablerets Alpine Centre, Switzerland, on 13 January.

Results
The race was started at 11:30 (Run 1) and 14:15 (Run 2).

References

Boys' giant slalom